Joseph Maddison (born 1838) was a British trade unionist.

Maddison worked in an iron foundry in Newcastle upon Tyne, and joined the Friendly Society of Iron Founders.  He spent eight years as a branch officer before, in 1886, he was elected as assistant general secretary of the union, then in 1894 he became general secretary.

Maddison supported the formation of the General Federation of Trade Unions and served as its first treasurer.  He also supported the Labour Representation Committee, and backed his old friend Arthur Henderson as the union's first sponsored Parliamentary candidate.

In 1902, Maddison visited the United States to study foundry working methods there.  The tour was sponsored by A. Mosely, who later proposed a Civic Federation Scheme of compulsory negotiations, which Maddison backed, but the union as a whole rejected.

Maddison turned seventy in 1908, and decided to retire.

References

1838 births
Year of death missing
General secretaries of British trade unions
Trade unionists from Newcastle upon Tyne